This is a list of years in Nigeria.

20th century

21st century

See also
 Timeline of Nigerian history

 
History of Nigeria
Nigeria-related lists
Nigeria